Dschinghis Khan, may refer to:
 Dschinghis Khan (band)
 Dschinghis Khan (song), West German entry in the Eurovision Song Contest 1979 performed by the aforementioned band
 Dschinghis Khan (album)
 Dschingis Khan, German for Genghis Khan